Phanaeus triangularis is a species of dung beetle in the family Scarabaeidae.

Subspecies
These three subspecies belong to the species Phanaeus triangularis:
 Phanaeus triangularis niger Olsoufieff, 1924
 Phanaeus triangularis texensis EDMONDS, 1994
 Phanaeus triangularis triangularis (Say, 1823)

References

Further reading

 

triangularis
Articles created by Qbugbot
Beetles described in 1823